Sarada Ma Girls College, established in 2006, is a women's college in Nabapally, Barasat. It offers undergraduate courses in arts and sciences.  It is affiliated to West Bengal State University.

Departments

Science
Chemistry
Physics
Mathematics 
Human Development
Microbiology
Computer Science
Food and Nutrition 
Biochemistry

Arts
Bengali
English 
History
Geography
Education
Sociology

Accreditation
Sarada Ma Girls College is recognized by the University Grants Commission (UGC).

See also
Education in India
List of colleges in West Bengal
Education in West Bengal

References

External links
smgc.co.in, Sarada Ma Girls College

Educational institutions established in 2006
Colleges affiliated to West Bengal State University
Women's universities and colleges in West Bengal
Universities and colleges affiliated with the Ramakrishna Mission
2006 establishments in West Bengal